Created in 2003, the Regent Park Film Festival (RPFF) in Toronto, Ontario, is a free community film festival dedicated to showcasing local and international independent works that are relevant to Regent Park. With films from all over the world, the festival aims to provide the residents of Regent Park, and beyond, with a forum for dialogue about social issues. The films shown reflect themes such as immigration, inner city issues, cultural identity, and multicultural relationships.

History 
In 2003, Chandra Siddan, a filmmaker and student in the York University's "Regent Park Community Education Program", founded the RPFF as an alternative educational setting for an assignment with support from her instructor Jeff Kugler, principal of Nelson Mandela Park Public School, who offered his school as the venue for the event, and Professor Harry Smaller who garnered broadly-based support from the University.

For seven years, the festival screened at the Nelson Mandela Park Public School before moving to the Lord Dufferin Public School for 2010 and 2011. On the tenth anniversary in 2012, the festival and its offices moved into the Daniels Spectrum cultural hub and started delivering year-round programming such as workshops and community screenings.

In 2007, a year after RPFF incorporated, Siddan stepped down as Festival Director and was replaced by Karin Haze until 2010, Richard Fung in 2011, Ananya Ohri from 2012 to 2018, Tendisai Cromwell from 2018 to 2019, and as of 2019, Angela Britto.

Programming and projects 
In addition to the film festival, RPFF provides year round programming including:
 Live it to Learn it: paid-internship program
 Under the Stars: summer movie screenings
 Workshops

Home Made Visible project 
In 2017, the RPFF embarked on a three-year project titled "Home Made Visible" after receiving funding from the Canadian Council for the Arts New Chapter. The three-part nationwide project:

 digitized home movies from the Indigenous and visible minority communities and donated a selection of clips for preservation at York University Libraries,
 commissioned six artist films,
 exhibited the artworks and selected home movie clips across Canada to encourage discussions around diverse histories and futures.

This project received nationwide media coverage.

In 2019, the project received Lieutenant Governor's Ontario Heritage Award for Excellence in Conservation from the Ontario Heritage Trust.

In 2020, the project was shortlisted for the Governor General Canada's History Award for Excellence in Community Programming.

Notable filmmakers, curators, programmers, and guests
Michelle Latimer
Lisa Wegner
Mehreen Jabbar
Byron Q
Charuvi Agrawal
Charles Officer
Phillip Pike
Mati Diop
Lulu Wang
Tasha Hubbard
Ali Kazimi

References

External links 

 

2003 establishments in Ontario
Film festivals in Toronto